Little Beaver may refer to:

 Little Beaver, the Jicarilla Apache pal of Red Ryder
 Willie Hale, musician also known as "Little Beaver"
 Little Beaver (wrestler), Canadian professional wrestler
 Little Beaver Creek State Wild and Scenic River and National Scenic River, in Ohio
 Marcel Dionne, with the nickname of Little Beaver
 Theodore Cleaver's nickname in the TV series Leave It to Beaver